David Famiyekyi Yankey (born January 18, 1992) is a former American football offensive guard. He played college football at Stanford, where he was a two-time consensus All-American. He was drafted by the Minnesota Vikings in the fifth round, 145th overall of the 2014 NFL Draft.

Early years
Yankey attended Centennial High School in Roswell, Georgia, where he earned four varsity letters playing as an offensive lineman for head coach Jeff Measor. He was a three-time All-region selection. As a senior, he earned honorable mention All-state honors. He also earned Centennial's Excalibur Award, an award that honors excellence in athletics, character, and leadership.

Regarded as a three-star recruit by Rivals.com, Yankey was ranked as the No. 47 offensive tackle in his class, while Scout.com rated him as the 44th best offensive tackle in the nation.

College career
Yankey attended Stanford University, where he played for coach Jim Harbaugh and coach David Shaw's Stanford Cardinal football teams from 2010 to 2013. He was a consensus All-American in 2012 and 2013. He announced on January 13, 2014, that he would enter the 2014 NFL Draft.

Professional career

Minnesota Vikings
Yankey was selected by the Minnesota Vikings in the fifth round (145 pick overall) of the 2014 NFL Draft.

On September 5, 2015, he was waived by the Vikings and was signed to the practice squad the next day.

Carolina Panthers
The Carolina Panthers signed Yankey to a futures contract on January 12, 2016. On September 3, 2016, he was waived by the Panthers as part of final roster cuts. The next day he was signed to the Panthers' practice squad. He was promoted to the active roster on November 25, 2016.

On September 1, 2017, Yankey was placed on injured reserve.

Personal life
Yankey was born in Sydney, Australia to David and Darina Yankey. He retained his Australian citizenship after his family moved to Roswell, Georgia when he was eight.

References

External links
Stanford Cardinal bio

1992 births
Living people
Sportspeople from Sydney
All-American college football players
American football offensive tackles
American football offensive guards
Stanford Cardinal football players
Minnesota Vikings players
Carolina Panthers players
People from Roswell, Georgia
Players of American football from Georgia (U.S. state)
Australian players of American football
Sportspeople from Fulton County, Georgia